Edward Henry John Craufurd (9 December 1816 – 29 August 1887) was a Scottish Radical politician.

He was the eldest son of John Craufurd of Auchenames and Kerse in the counties of Renfrewshire and Ayr, Treasurer General of the Ionian Islands, and Sophia Marianne Churchill, daughter of Major General Churchill and great-granddaughter of Sir Robert Walpole.

He was educated at Trinity College, Cambridge, where he obtained a scholarship in 1840 and graduated as 12th senior optime. He was called to the bar at the Inner Temple in 1845 and practised on the Home Circuit and attended the Surrey Sessions.  He was editor of The Legal Examiner

In 1860 he married Frances, daughter of the Rev William Molesworth, Rector of St Breock, Cornwall, and sister of the Rev Sir Paul William Molesworth, 10th Baronet of Pencarrow and niece of James Wentworth Buller, MP for North Devon.

He was a Deputy Lieutenant and Justice of the Peace for Buteshire and a JP for Ayrshire.  he was a member of the English Law Amendment Society and the Scottish Society for promoting the Amendment of the Law.  He promoted the Scotch Affirmation Act, the Jurors Affirmation Act and the Judgments Extension Act 1868.

He was Member of Parliament for Ayr Burghs from 1852 until 1874.

Sources
Debrett's House of Commons, 1870
 Clan Crawford Association

External links 
 

1816 births
1887 deaths
Members of the Parliament of the United Kingdom for Scottish constituencies
UK MPs 1852–1857
UK MPs 1857–1859
UK MPs 1859–1865
UK MPs 1865–1868
UK MPs 1868–1874
Alumni of Trinity College, Cambridge
Deputy Lieutenants of Buteshire
Members of the Inner Temple